Frank J. LaBuda (born 15 December 1949) was a Sullivan County Court Judge and a Sullivan County Surrogate's Court judge from 1997 through 2019. In 2007, he was appointed an acting justice of the Sullivan County Supreme Court in the 3rd Judicial District of New York. He retired from the bench in 2019 when he reached the New York County Court Judges Mandatory retirement age of 70.

Double-dipping 
In a database created by the Democrat & Chronicle, LaBuda was listed among "double dipping" state employees for collecting both a $184,731.51 salary and a $103,975.92 state pension at the same time. The dual pension payments/paychecks occurred throughout both 2018 and 2019.

Party affiliation change, DA run, BofE rejection 
After decades as a Democrat, LaBuda changed his party affiliation to Republican in January 2020. Two weeks later, he announced his intention to run against Acting Sullivan County District Attorney Meagan Galligan,who was endorsed by the Sullivan County Democratic, Republican, Independence, and Conservative parties. LaBuda won against Galligan in a Republican primary in June 2020.

LaBuda's efforts to secure an Independent line on the ballot failed in August 2020 when the Sullivan County Board of Elections determined the “For the People” party petition to nominate LaBuda was invalid. According to the Board of Elections, the petition contained 1,477 signatures and required 810 valid signatures from registered voters. There were 882 objections bringing the total number of valid signatures to 595.

LaBuda v. LaBuda
County Court Judge Frank LaBuda's brother, Peter LaBuda, accused the judge of intentionally running him over with an ATV on September 25, 2016. Peter is quoted in a story in the Times Herald-Record as saying, “When I wouldn’t get out of the way, he hit the throttle… He went full throttle over me and kept going... he dragged me, like six or eight feet.” Peter was treated for a broken leg and broken ribs.

Peter Labuda filed a family-offense petition in Delaware Family Court on Sept. 27, saying his brother intentionally ran him over. Judge LaBuda was eventually cleared of charges in connection with an ATV crash. Delaware County Family Court Judge Gary Rosa found that the charges - assault, menacing harassment and reckless endangerment in the initial encounter, and a separate charge of violating an order of protection - were not proven. According to excerpts from a Times Herald-Record story:

On Sept. 25, near Wurtsboro, Frank LaBuda rode his ATV onto his brother’s property, allegedly “nicking” Peter Labuda as he passed. Peter Labuda called 911 to report a trespasser. On Frank LaBuda’s return trip, Peter Labuda blocked the path, standing about a foot in front of the ATV. The machine accelerated and traveled about 30 yards, crashing into a stone bench and fireplace.

Rosa’s decision noted that sheriff’s investigators interviewed Peter Labuda for an hour and a half in his hospital room, providing Miranda warnings, and recording his statement. In contrast, Rosa wrote, Judge LaBuda was interviewed for less than 30 minutes, was not read his rights or recorded, and wrote out his own statement.

“This incident is the unfortunate result of arrogance and childishness from the meeting at the coffee shop up to and including the parties’ encounter on Sept. 25, 2016,” Rosa wrote. “All of this because two well-educated, professional, grown men acted like a couple of adolescents. Failure to act one’s age, however, is not a family offense.”

Judge LaBuda was on paid leave from the bench for nearly 7 months after the incident.

Early life and education
In 1967, LaBuda graduated from high school in the Bronx. Three and a half years later, he graduated Phi Beta Kappa from City University. He then went on to receive  a J.D. from Case Western Reserve University School of Law in Cleveland, Ohio.

Career
In 1978, he became Chief Assistant District Attorney in Sullivan County, New York and stayed at that position until 1989.  Subsequently, LaBuda was elected Town Justice in the Town of Mamakating in Sullivan County, and served four years.

LaBuda served in the Judge Advocate General's Corps, United States Army in the Gulf War, as a Major in the 301st Logistical Support group. He also served in the 2003 Iraq War.  LaBuda is also past President of the Wurtsboro Fire Co. #1 and a past President of the Sullivan County Volunteer Fireman's Association.

Judge LaBuda will reach mandatory retirement age for New York County Court Judges in December 2019, and must therefore retire at the end of that year.

Notable decisions

People v. Carl Colberg
In Colberg, LaBuda held that "battered person syndrome" can be used as a defense in criminal cases. Previously, "battered woman defense" was the only "battered" defense available. In this case, Colberg, who allegedly had a history of alcohol and prescription drug abuse, broke down his parents' bedroom door and moved toward them in an "uncontrollable rage." His father shot and killed his son, and the defense counsel wanted to present the son's history of physical and verbal abuse toward his parents to make out a case that the shooting was justified as self-defense.

People v. Embry
Paul Embry was sentenced to a six-year determinate sentence for burglary. At that time, New York had passed a law requiring defendants such as Embry to be given an additional term of six months post release supervision (PRS). However, in Embry's case, he was not given the PRS at his sentencing. The Department of Corrections added the PRS to his sentence when he initially began serving his prison sentence.

In another similar case, the New York Court of Appeals held that a term of PRS is invalid if it is added to a sentence by DOCS. The Court of Appeals said that a sentence is only valid if it is pronounced by a judicial officer, not DOCS.

Subsequent to this Court of Appeals decision, the prosecution filed a motion to have Embry resentenced to term of PRS. Embry argued that a resenticing violates his double jeopardy rights.

People v. Robar
In Robar, LaBuda held that the ban on discriminatory use of peremptory challenges, first announced by the Supreme Court in Batson v. Kentucky, 476 U.S. 79 (1986), applied not only to race or gender (see J.E.B. v. Alabama, 511 U.S. 127 (1994)), but also to the discrete class of "hunters". LaBuda declared, "To systematically exclude that recognized and defined class of people in a jury trial is something that raises the court's attention under Luciano [v. New York]." In Luciano, the New York Court of Appeals defined the scope of Batson as including "race, gender or any other status that implicates equal protection concerns."

References

New York Supreme Court Justices
Living people
New York (state) Republicans
Case Western Reserve University School of Law alumni
People from the Bronx
People from Sullivan County, New York
1949 births